Sofia Vyacheslavovna Samodurova (pronounced Sah-moh-DOO-roh-vah; ; born 30 July 2002) is a Russian retired figure skater. She is the 2019 European champion, the 2019 CS Ice Star champion, the 2018 Rostelecom Cup silver medalist, and the 2018 Skate America bronze medalist.

On the junior level, she is the 2017 JGP Croatia and 2017 JGP Italy champion. Since retiring from competition, she works as a skating coach.

Personal life 
Samodurova was born on 30 July 2002 in Krasnoyarsk, Krasnoyarsk Krai, Russia.

Career

Early career 
Samodurova began learning to skate in 2007. She finished sixteenth at the 2015 Russian Junior Championships and sixth the following year at the 2016 Russian Junior Championships

2016–2017 season 
Coached by Tatiana Mishina and Oleg Tataurov in Saint Petersburg, Samodurova finished fourth in her ISU Junior Grand Prix (JGP) debut, which took place in September 2016 in Yokohama, Japan.  Called in as a reserve replacement, she placed ninth at her first senior nationals, the 2017 Russian Championships in December 2016.  In February, she finished twelfth at the 2017 Russian Junior Championships.  She culminated her season by winning a silver medal behind teammate Elizaveta Nugumanova at the Triglav Trophy.

2017–2018 season 
Coached by Mishina and Alexei Mishin, Samodurova started her season with gold at the 2017 JGP in Zagreb, Croatia, having obtained a total score 12 points greater than the silver medalist, Mako Yamashita.  The following month, she edged out Alena Kostornaia by 0.04 for the gold at the JGP in Egna, Italy.  Samodurova was the second-ranked qualifier (behind Alexandra Trusova) for the 2017–18 Junior Grand Prix Final in Nagoya, Japan.  She finished sixth at the Final.  Her season ended at the 2018 Russian Championships, where she finished eleventh.

2018–2019 season 
Samodurova started her season off at the 2018 CS Lombardia Trophy.  Placing second in the short program and fourth in the free skate, she placed second overall, earning the silver medal, trailing behind fellow Russian competitor Elizaveta Tuktamysheva.  She made her Grand Prix debut at Skate America, where she won the bronze medal behind Satoko Miyahara and Kaori Sakamoto with a personal best score of 198.70 points.  In mid-November she competed at the 2018 Rostelecom Cup where she won the silver medal behind Alina Zagitova after placing second in both programs.  With one Grand Prix silver medal and one bronze medal she qualified for the 2018–19 Grand Prix Final, where she finished fifth with a personal best score of 204.33 points:  "Achieving the season's best was great. I believe that today I did everything to the maximum."

At the 2019 Russian Championships, Samodurova placed sixth in both programs and overall.  She was the third-ranked skater eligible to compete at senior international competitions, behind Stanislava Konstantinova and Alina Zagitova.  At the 2019 European Championships in Minsk, Samodurova placed second in the short program behind Zagitova, passed the 70-point mark for the first time.  In the free program, Zagitova skated poorly, while Samodurova skated a clean program and won the European title ahead of Zagitova and Finnish figure skater Viveca Lindfors.  Of the result, she said "I can't find words to describe what I am feeling now. I am European Champion and that's so awesome!"

Samodurova was assigned to the World Championships in Saitama along with Zagitova and Evgenia Medvedeva.  She placed ninth in the short program, and expressed disappointment that her scores were lower than those at the European Championships.  She rose to eighth place in the free skate, making only one minor error on a double jump, and said she felt "only happiness" with the result.  Samodurova concluded the season as part of the bronze medal-winning Team Russia at the 2019 World Team Trophy.

2019–2020 season 
Samodurova admitted to having some issues in training for the new season after falling multiple times at the Russian test skate events.  On the Challenger series, she placed sixth at the 2019 CS Lombardia Trophy before winning the 2019 CS Ice Star.  On the Grand Prix, she was fifth at the 2019 Cup of China, after struggling with underrotations on several jumping passes.  Fourth at the 2019 CS Golden Spin of Zagreb, she finished the season with a ninth-place finish at the 2020 Russian Championships.

2020–2021 season 
Samodurova performed her short program at the senior Russian test skates, but withdrew from the free skate due to a cold.  She placed fourth at both the second and third stages of the Russian Cup series, qualifying for the 2020 Russian Championships.

With the COVID-19 pandemic limiting international travel, Samodurova competed at the 2020 Ice Star, winning the bronze medal.  She was assigned to the 2020 Rostelecom Cup, the ISU having run the Grand Prix based mainly on geographic location.  She was sixth in the short program, but dropped to seventh place after the free skate.  At the 2021 Russian Championships, Samodurova placed tenth.

2021–2022 season 
Samodurova picked music from Harry Gregson-Williams' Mulan score for the free program, citing parallels between the title character and her own life as a "fighter." She made her season debut at the 2021 Budapest Trophy, winning the bronze medal. Samodurova's lone Grand Prix assignment for the season was initially the 2021 Cup of China, but following its cancellation she was reassigned to the 2021 Gran Premio d'Italia in Turin. She placed seventh at the event, and pronounced herself "really happy" with her free skate despite a triple flip error.

At the 2022 Russian Championships, Samodurova finished in eleventh place.

Following the national championships, Samodurova decided to retire, and informed her coach that she intended to move to Kazakhstan to live with her parents and extended family. However, her coach Alexei Mishin persuaded her to remain as a coach at his skating school working with younger children.

Programs

Competitive highlights 
GP: Grand Prix; CS: Challenger Series; JGP: Junior Grand Prix

Detailed results

Senior level 

Small medals for short and free programs awarded only at ISU Championships. At team events, medals awarded for team results only.
Personal bests highlighted in bold.

Junior level 

Personal bests highlighted in italic.

References

External links 
 
 

2002 births
Russian female single skaters
European Figure Skating Championships medalists
Living people
Sportspeople from Krasnoyarsk